The 1998–99 Perth Glory SC season was the club's third in the Australian National Soccer League (NSL) and the first where they made the finals series.

Review and events
In June 1998 the club announced that former East Germany manager Bernd Stange had been appointed as coach, replacing Gary Marocchi who had been sacked in April. Mich d'Avray, a former England under-21 international was appointed as Stange's assistant coach.

The Glory opened the season with an eight-match unbeaten run, dropping points only to the Brisbane Strikers. The run was broken with a loss to Newcastle Breakers in December 1998. Despite winning only one match in December 1998 and January 1999, the club rallied to win 10 of the last eleven matches of the season to finish in third place on the table.

Match results

Legend

League

Finals series

References

Perth Glory FC seasons